M.M.M. 83 (also known as Missione mortale Molo 83) is a 1965 Italian spy film directed by Sergio Bergonzelli.

Cast
Fred Beir	as Jack Morris
Gérard Blain		as Robert Gibson
Pier Angeli		as Hélène Blanchard
Silvia Solar 	as Janette 
Alberto Dalbés 	as Renard
Gianni Solaro 	as Fiksch
André Lorugues 
Mario Lanfranchi
Ignazio Dolce
Mario Magnolia 
Attilio Severini

External links
 
 M.M.M. 83 at Variety Distribution

1965 films
1960s spy thriller films
1960s Italian-language films
Italian spy thriller films
Films directed by Sergio Bergonzelli
Films with screenplays by Sergio Bergonzelli
1960s Italian films